Gregorini may refer to:

 34004 Gregorini, minor planet
 Gregorini, Italian surname (and its French variant)